Adrián Oquendo (born 23 February 1990) is a Cuban rower. He competed in the men's double sculls event at the 2016 Summer Olympics.

References

External links
 
 

1990 births
Living people
Cuban male rowers
Olympic rowers of Cuba
Rowers at the 2016 Summer Olympics
Place of birth missing (living people)
Pan American Games medalists in rowing
Pan American Games silver medalists for Cuba
Rowers at the 2015 Pan American Games
Medalists at the 2015 Pan American Games
Medalists at the 2011 Pan American Games